= OWU Radio =

OWU Radio -- The Line
Delaware, Ohio; United States
- Frequency: streaming
- Branding: The Line

Programming
- Format: music and talk

Ownership
- Owner: Ohio Wesleyan University

History
- First air date: Mondays through Fridays

Technical information
- Facility ID: 50151

Links
- Webcast: Listen live
- Website: Official website

OWU Radio replaced the former WSLN (98.7 FM) in 2012, moving from a broadcasting radio station to a live streaming station with a college radio format. WSLN was housed for decades in Slocum Hall, but the new streaming station was moved to Phillips Hall in 2014. The station is owned by Ohio Wesleyan University in Delaware, Ohio.

The OWU Radio studio is located on the first floor of Phillips Hall as part of the Department of Journalism suite of offices. It features basic production tools for streaming. The station is student-run while the university is in session. It includes programming by students, faculty and staff.

In the fall of 2004, WSLN introduced internet radio.

On May 31, 2012, the station's license was cancelled and the call sign deleted by the Federal Communications Commission from its database, per the licensee's request.

The station now broadcasts exclusively through internet radio.

== Programming ==
OWU Radio's format includes music and talk produced by students, faculty and staff. Radio programs on OWU Radio run the gamut from bluegrass to independent hip hop to classical, and DJs are restricted only by FCC guidelines.
